The 2016 Slovenian FIM Speedway Grand Prix was the opening race of the 2016 Speedway Grand Prix season. It took place on April 30th at the Matija Gubec Stadium in Krško, Slovenia.

Riders 
First reserve Fredrik Lindgren replaced Jarosław Hampel, who had injured himself during the 2015 Speedway World Cup and was not fit for the start of the 2016 season. The Speedway Grand Prix Commission also nominated Denis Štojs as the wild card, and Nick Škorja and Matic Ivačič both as Track Reserves.

Results 
The Grand Prix was won by Peter Kildemand, who beat Jason Doyle, Chris Holder and defending world champion Tai Woffinden in the final. Kildemand therefore took an early lead in the world championship standings. Despite finishing third in the final, Holder was second in the standings after outscoring Doyle on the night.

Heat details

The intermediate classification

References

See also 
 motorcycle speedway

Slovenia
Speedway Grand Prix
2016 in Slovenian sport
Speedway Grand Prix of Slovenia